Jeri Westerson, born 1960, is an American novelist of medieval mysteries, Tudor mysteries, historical novels, and paranormal novels, along with LGBTQ mysteries under the pen name Haley Walsh.

Career 
Westerson, born and raised in Los Angeles, California, originally had designs on a career as an actress but changed her major in college to graphic design. After graduating, she continued as a successful commercial artist in the Los Angeles area for fifteen years before semi-retiring to start a family. She began writing seriously for publication two years after that.

Westerson was a newspaper reporter for the next eight years, writing as a stringer for several local papers to hone her skills. After that, she had several part-time jobs while continuing to write historical novels, including tasting host and tour guide for a local winery, choir director and soloist for a church, theology teacher, and secretary.

Westerson sold her first medieval mystery novel, Veil of Lies, in 2007 to St. Martin’s Minotaur. Her series is styled a “Medieval Noir” with a hardboiled protagonist set in the Middle Ages. Her debut medieval mystery with protagonists Crispin Guest, a disgraced knight turned detective, along with his cutpurse servant Jack Tucker, received a nomination for the Macavity Award (Sue Feder Historical Mystery Award) and the Shamus Award for Best First Mystery, the first medieval mystery to be nominated for this PI award given by the Private Eye Writers of America.

The second Crispin Guest novel, Serpent In The Thorns, was released in 2009, and received nominations for the Bruce Alexander Historical Mystery Award and the Macavity Award (Sue Feder Historical Mystery Award). The third Crispin Guest novel, The Demon’s Parchment, was released in 2010 and also finaled for the Macavity Award and the Romantic Times Reviewers’ Choice Award.

In October 2011, Minotaur Books published her fourth medieval mystery entitled Troubled Bones. It received nominations for the Macavity, RT Reviewer's Choice, the Bruce Alexander Award, and the Agatha. In October 2012, her fifth, Blood Lance was released and was named one of the “Ten Hot Crime Novels for Colder Days” by Kirkus Reviews.  Her sixth and last from Minotaur Shadow of the Alchemist, was released October 15, 2013. It was nominated for the RT Reviewers' Choice Award and was named by Suspense Magazine as one of the Best of 2013.

Westerson decided to release a prequel to the series, Cup of Blood, on her own under the label Old London Press. The book was released July 25, 2014, and was nominated for the Bruce Alexander Award and semi-finaled for the M.M. Bennetts Award for Historical Fiction.

Severn House, a UK based publisher, picked up the series beginning with The Silence of Stones—released first in the UK in November 2015 and in the US in February 2016. Her follow-up A Maiden Weeping released in the UK in April 2016 with a US release in August 2016. Next came Season of Blood, which also garnered a nomination for the Bruce Alexander Award  with the next book, The Deepest Grave released in the US in August 2018. The fifteenth and final Crispin Guest book, The Deadliest Sin, was released in December 2021. All told, the series has garnered thirteen national mystery nominations.

Westerson ventured into the world of the paranormal romance with Booke of the Hidden, released October 31, 2017 by Diversion Books. The series is complete in four books, with Deadly Rising, Shadows in the Mist, and concluding with The Darkest Gateway. A spin-off series from Booke of the Hidden, Moonrisers; A Werewolf Mystery released February 2020.  She has also written a gaslamp fantasy/steampunk trilogy, Enchanter Chronicles.

In 2010, writing as Haley Walsh, Westerson published the first in a series of LGBTQ romantic comedy mysteries featuring high school English teacher and amateur sleuth Skyler Foxe, with the book Foxe Tail, published by MLR Press. The second in the series, Foxe Hunt, was released in September 2011, and the third, Out-Foxed was released November 2012.

A follow-up novella, Foxe Den was self-published in December 2012. The next full-length Skyler Foxe mystery, Foxe Fire, was released in January 2014, and the fifth, Desert Foxe was released November 2014. Two novellas, Foxe Den 2: Summer Vacation and A Very Merry Foxemas were published in 2015. Crazy Like A Foxe, the next full-length mystery, was published in 2016, and the last of the series Stone Cold Foxe was released in 2017.

In 2011, author Tim Hallinan asked Westerson to participate in a short story e-book anthology whose entire proceeds would raise money for Japan earthquake relief. The book, called Shaken: Stories for Japan, includes nineteen other authors, such as Brett Battles and Ken Kuhlken. Jeri offered her historical short story “The Noodle Girl” for inclusion in this Japanese-themed book.

In 2012, she was asked by two other editors to contribute to anthologies, the November released Murder and Mayhem in Muskego and 2015's serial anthology, Day of the Destroyers. Her gay erotic short story under the name Haley Walsh, "Marked," was included in the anthology Anything for a Dollar, edited by Todd Gregory, released October 15, 2013.

In 2021, Gary Phillips, editing the Akashic Noir series anthology South Central Noir, asked Westerson to contribute her original short story The Last Time I Died, released September 2022.

Westerson served two terms as president of the Southern California chapter of Mystery Writers of America from Jan 2013 to Dec 2014, is former Vice President of the Sisters in Crime Los Angeles chapter (Jan 2012 to Dec 2013), and has served two terms as past president of the Orange County California chapter of Sisters in Crime. She is also a founding member of the Los Angeles chapter of the Historical Novel Society and other professional writing organizations.

Westerson has lived in Menifee, California since 1993.

Bibliography

The Crispin Guest Mysteries 
Veil of Lies (2008) Minotaur Books
Serpent In The Thorns (2009) Minotaur Books
The Demon’s Parchment (2010) Minotaur Books
Troubled Bones (2011) Minotaur Books
 Blood Lance (2012) Minotaur Books
 Shadow of the Alchemist (2013) Minotaur Books
 Cup of Blood: A Prequel (2014) Old London Press
 The Silence of Stones (UK December 2015) (US February 2016) Severn House
 A Maiden Weeping (UK April 2016) (US August 2016) Severn House
 Season of Blood (2017) Severn House
 The Deepest Grave (2018) Severn House
 Traitor's Codex (2019) Severn House
 Sword of Shadows (2020) Severn House
 Spiteful Bones (2021) Severn House
 The Deadliest Sin (2021) Severn House, the last Crispin Guest novel

The King's Fool Mysteries 
 Courting Dragons (2023) Severn House
 The Lioness Stumbles (2024) Severn House

An Irregular Detective Mystery Series (Sherlockian) 
 The Isolated Seance (2023) Severn House
 The Mummy of Mayfair (2024) Severn House

Oswald the Thief Medieval Caper series 
 Oswald the Thief (2022)
 Oswald the Gambler (2024)

Historical Novels 
 Though Heaven Fall (2014)
 Native Spirit: The Story of Saint Kateri Tekakwitha (2014) Writing as Anne Castell
 Roses in the Tempest (2015)

Paranormal Novels

Booke of the Hidden Series
 Booke of the Hidden: Booke One in the Booke of the Hidden Series (October 31, 2017) Diversion Books
 Deadly Rising: Booke Two in the Booke of the Hidden Series (October 23, 2018) Diversion Books, EverAfter Romance Imprint
 Shadows in the Mist: Booke Three in the Booke of the Hidden Series (JABberwocky May 2019)
 The Darkest Gateway: Booke Four and the last in the Booke of the Hidden Series (JABberwocky October 2019)

Enchanter Chronicles Trilogy
 The Daemon Device Book One in the Enchanter Chronicles (Dragua Press October 2019)
 Clockwork Gypsy Book Two in the Enchanter Chronicles (October 2020) Dragua Press
 Library of the Damned Final book in the Enchanter Chronicles Trilogy (Oct 2021) Dragua Press

Moonriser Werewolf Mystery Series
 Moonriser Werewolf Mysteries Book One Moonrisers; A Werewolf Mystery (Dragua Press March 2020)
 Baying for Blood Book Two in the Moonriser Werewolf Mystery Series (April 2021) Dragua Press

The Skyler Foxe Mysteries (writing as Haley Walsh) 
 Foxe Tail (2010) MLR Press
 Foxe Hunt (2011) MLR Press
 Out-Foxed (2012) MLR Press
 Foxe Den; A Skyler Foxe Holiday Short Story Collection (2012) Novella, Foxe Press
 Foxe Fire (2014) MLR Press
 Desert Foxe (2014) MLR Press
 Foxe Den 2: Summer Vacation (2015) Novella, Foxe Press
 A Very Merry Foxemas (2015) Novella, Foxe Press
 Crazy Like a Foxe (2016) Foxe Press
 Stone Cold Foxe (2017) Foxe Press (Last in the series)

Short Stories 
 "Pax" in Kinesis Literary Magazine (1997)
 "The Tin Box" in St. Anthony Messenger Magazine (won second place in the Best Short Story Contest sponsored by the Catholic Press Association; 2003) and now on Kindle (2013)
 "Catching Elijah" in St. Anthony Messenger Magazine (2004) and now on Kindle (2013)
 "The Noodle Girl" in Shaken: Stories for Japan anthology, edited by Tim Hallinan (2011)
 "Universal Donor" in Murder and Mayhem in Muskego anthology, edited by Jon Jordan (2012)
 "Do-Over" an ebook short story (writing as Haley Walsh) (2012)
 "Marked" in Anything for a Dollar (writing as Haley Walsh), edited by Todd Gregory (2013)
 "Mesmer Maneuver" in Day of the Destroyers serial anthology, edited by Gary Phillips (2015)
 "Dark Chamber: A Crispin Guest Short Story" (2016)
 "Last Pole on the Left: A Santa Noir Short Story" (2019)
 "The Last Time I Died" in South Central Noir anthology, Akashic Noir, edited by Gary Phillips (Sept 2022)

Editing 
 LAdies Night: Sisters in Crime Anthology edited by Naomi Hirahara, Kate Thornton, and Jeri Westerson (2015)

References

External links 
 
  Booke of the Hidden
  Enchanter Chronicles
  Skyler Foxe Mysteries

21st-century American novelists
American mystery writers
American women short story writers
American women novelists
Writers from Los Angeles
1960 births
Living people
Women mystery writers
21st-century American women writers
21st-century American short story writers
Pseudonymous women writers
21st-century pseudonymous writers